Visciano is a municipality, that is on the edge of the Metropolitan City of Naples, on the border with the province of Avellino in Campania. As of 31 December 2004, it had a population of 4,607 and an area of 10.9 km2.

Visciano borders the following municipalities: Avella (AV), Baiano (AV), Casamarciano, Liveri, Marzano di Nola, Monteforte Irpino (AV), Mugnano del Cardinale (AV), Nola, Pago del Vallo di Lauro (AV), Sperone (AV), Taurano (AV).

Demographic evolution

References

External links
 www.comuneviscianona.it

Cities and towns in Campania